First Baptist Church is a historic African-American Baptist church complex located at Covington, Virginia. The property includes two churches.  One of the churches was built about 1890, and is a Gothic Revival style frame church. After construction of the 1911 church, it served as a classroom annex and cafeteria for a nearby school. The 1911 church is a Gothic Revival / Colonial Revival brick church.  It features a corner belfry tower, lancet arched stained-glass windows, and a modernistic 1955 education wing.

It was added to the National Register of Historic Places in 2002.

References

African-American history of Virginia
Baptist churches in Virginia
Churches on the National Register of Historic Places in Virginia
Gothic Revival church buildings in Virginia
Colonial Revival architecture in Virginia
Churches completed in 1890
19th-century Baptist churches in the United States
Buildings and structures in Covington, Virginia
National Register of Historic Places in Covington, Virginia